Martin Nörl (born 12 August 1993) is a German snowboarder. He competed in the 2018 Winter Olympics.

References

1993 births
Living people
Snowboarders at the 2018 Winter Olympics
Snowboarders at the 2022 Winter Olympics
German male snowboarders
Olympic snowboarders of Germany
Sportspeople from Landshut
21st-century German people